The Tlosaih are one of the major groups of the Mara people, who inhabited the southernmost part of Mizoram under the Mara Autonomous District Council. The Tlosaih language was transliterated into the Roman script by late missionary Reverend Reginald Arthur Lorrain, founder of the Evangelical Church of Maraland, and it is used as a liturgical language and in literature. The Tlosaih language formed a common language for all of the Mara people and is commonly known as the Mara language.

All Tlosais live in India. The group lives mostly in the western and northwestern part of Maraland, India. The towns Siaha, Thosai, Tisopi, Amobyuh, Amotlah, Thiahra, Saikao, Laty, Pala, Tokalo, Kiasie, Lodawh, Lomasu and Bymari are all Tlosai villages.

Tlôsaih people can be divided into two groups; Siaha-Tlôsaih and Saikao-Tlôsaih. The village Saikao was previously known as Tlôsaih as in the past Mara villages were usually named after their sub-tribes, in contrast to the Lusei tribe who named their villages after their chief. Almost all Tlosaih villages were ruled by Hlychho chiefs.

Ethnic groups in Northeast India
Ethnic groups in South Asia